Hyogo FM Broadcasting Co. Ltd. (DBA Kiss-FM KOBE.Co.Ltd) is an FM radio station in Kobe, Hyogo, Japan.

Overview
The network was first launched as a relay station of FM Oita (Air-Radio FM88, Oita Prefecture) in October, 1990. It was an independent station until it joined JFN on April 1, 2003.

Its main broadcast frequency is at 89.9 MHz, with an output of 1 kW and transmits from the Rokko mount range where reception is possible for most of the Kansai area.

There was a satellite studio, now closed, in the America Mura of Osaka.

program 
4 seasons
Kiss Music Presenter

See also
 List of radio stations in Japan

External links
Kiss FM KOBE

Radio in Japan
Mass media in Kobe
Radio stations established in 1990
1990 establishments in Japan